Eugene Hermann Plumacher (1837– September 25, 1910) was U.S. consul to Maracaibo (now part of Venezuela) from 1877 until 1890. He started his career as a sea captain, later serving in the Union Army as a colonel and working as a university professor.

Biography 
Plumacher was born in 1837, in Prussia. He worked as a sea captain and married the philosopher Olga Marie Pauline Hünerwadel; they had two children. The family later emigrated to the U.S. where he helped establish the Swiss colony of Beersheba Springs, Tennessee. He served as a colonel in the Union Army during the American Civil War.

He later survived a bout of yellow fever and relayed reports on upheavals and conflicts in Maracaibo, which is now part of Venezuela. He studied lepers and leprosy, postulating that it was a hereditary condition. He also worked as a university professor in Tennessee.

The Inter Ocean ran a story in 1903 about how Plumacher discouraged others seeking his consul post by highlighting the deadly diseases and dangers surrounding the post. Plumacher corresponded with Dr. Charles Sajous. In his memoirs he discusses various aspects of life in Maracaibo.

Plumacher retired from his consul position in 1910 and died in Washington, D.C., on September 25 of the same year. He was buried in Glenwood Cemetery, Washington, D.C.

Publications 
 Plumacher, Eugene H. Memorias ("Memoirs"). 1912

References

Further reading
 Obituary in the Los Angeles Herald, September 27, 1910 - Volume XXXVII, Number 361 page 3

1837 births
1910 deaths
Ambassadors of the United States to Venezuela
Burials at Glenwood Cemetery (Washington, D.C.)
German emigrants to the United States
Sea captains
Union Army colonels